All TV (stylized as ALLTV) is a Philippine free-to-air broadcast television network based in Mandaluyong, with its broadcast facilities and studios located at Starmall EDSA-Shaw in EDSA corner Shaw Boulevard; its transmitter is located at the ABS-CBN-owned Millennium Transmitter site, Sgt. Esguerra Ave, Brgy. South Triangle, Diliman, Quezon City and currently broadcasts on weekdays from 12 noon to 10:30 p.m., Saturdays from 12 noon to 9:30 p.m., and Sundays from 11:30 a.m. to 9:30 p.m. It serves as the flagship property of Advanced Media Broadcasting System. All TV's flagship television station is DZMV-TV which carries the VHF Channel 2 (analog broadcast) and UHF Channel 16 (digital broadcast) previously used by ABS-CBN Corporation under DWWX-TV after its broadcast franchise lapsed in 2020.

History
In 2019, Advanced Media Broadcasting System (AMBS) was granted a 25-year legislative franchise extension under Republic Act No. 11253 albeit without President Rodrigo Duterte's signature as the bill lapsed into law after 30 days of inaction. The Vera family and AMBS president Andrew Santiago sold AMBS to Planet Cable of real estate magnate and businessman-politician Manny Villar.

On January 5, 2022, the National Telecommunications Commission (NTC), headed by Gamaliel Cordoba, awarded the frequencies of VHF analog channel 2 and  digital channel 16 to AMBS. Furthermore, the channel 2 allocation was given a provisional authority to operate for 18 months until the analog shut-off of the country scheduled in 2023. These channels were previously used by ABS-CBN under the callsign DWWX-TV. The ABS-CBN network was shut down on May 5, 2020, due to a cease and desist order from the NTC after Congress failed to renew its broadcast franchise.

In June 2022, AMBS Manila began its test broadcast. On September 1, 2022, TV host Willie Revillame announced that the TV station of AMBS will be named as All TV. Initially slated for October 1, the station made its soft launch on September 13, 2022, at 12 noon, with plans of expanding it nationwide at the soonest possible time, as announced by Willie Revillame; the grand launch will take place before the early 2023. On July 15, 2022, during his contract signing with AMBS, Revillame announced that his variety show Wowowin would return on All TV since its final broadcast on GMA Network on February 11, 2022. Weeks after, actress and TV host Toni Gonzaga and her husband and director Paul Soriano, DZRH broadcaster and former ABS-CBN News anchor Anthony Taberna, singer and actress Ciara Sotto, and TV host Mariel Rodriguez also signed their contracts with AMBS. An exclusive interview of Toni Gonzaga with President Bongbong Marcos inside the Malacañang Palace was aired on All TV, the same day the network was soft-launched.

AMBS also signed their partnerships with CNN Philippines, a joint venture between Nine Media/RPN and Warner Bros. Discovery Asia-Pacific for the simultaneous airing of its flagship Filipino newscast News Night and the Philippine Cable Television Association (PCTA) to carry All TV on more than 300 cable providers nationwide who are members of the PCTA. River Where the Moon Rises, Again My Life and From Now On, Showtime! are the first three Korean dramas aired on All TV.

Programming

Since February 6, 2023, some programs of All TV were temporarily shelved due to unknown reasons.

References

Advanced Media Broadcasting System
2022 establishments in the Philippines
Television networks in the Philippines
Television channels and stations established in 2022
Digital television stations in the Philippines
Television stations in Metro Manila
Television in Metro Manila